The Advanta Championships of Philadelphia (also long known as the Virginia Slims of Philadelphia) was a WTA Tour professional tennis tournament for women played from 1971 through 2005 in Philadelphia, United States. The tournament was classified on the WTA Tour as a Tier I event from 1993 through 1995.  It was classified as a Tier II event in 1991, 1992, and from 1996 through 2005. The tournament was played indoors, on carpet from 1991 through 2000, and on hard courts from 1971 through 1979 and from 2003 through 2005.

Past singles champions include Conchita Martínez, Margaret Court, Chris Evert, Monica Seles, Steffi Graf, Martina Hingis, Lindsay Davenport, and Amélie Mauresmo.

Finals

Singles

Doubles

See also
Sports in Philadelphia
WTA Tier I Events

External links

 
Indoor tennis tournaments
Hard court tennis tournaments
Carpet court tennis tournaments
WTA Tour
Sports in Philadelphia
Recurring events disestablished in 2005
Defunct tennis tournaments in the United States
Virginia Slims tennis tournaments
Recurring sporting events established in 1971
1971 establishments in Pennsylvania
2005 disestablishments in Pennsylvania